Lajos Bálint (6 July 1929 – 4 April 2010) was a Roman Catholic archbishop of the Roman Catholic Archdiocese of Alba Iulia, Romania.

Ordained to the priesthood on 28 April 1958, Bálint was named a bishop for the Alba Iulia archdiocese on 9 July 1981 and was ordained on 29 September 1981. He resigned on 29 November 1993.

Notes

20th-century Roman Catholic archbishops in Romania
1929 births
2010 deaths